Phantom quartz is a variety of quartz consisting of visible layers of overlapping crystal growths. The outline of the inner crystals can be seen due to some variation in composition or mineral inclusion making the boundary between growths visible. The interior crystal layers are known as phantoms. Phantoms can be found in many varieties of quartz.   

Like regular quartz, the chemical composition of phantom quartz is silicon dioxide (SiO2).

See also
Pseudomorph
List of minerals

References

Quartz varieties